Chebulic may refer to:
 Chebulic acid, a phenolic acid found in Terminalia chebula
 Chebulic myrobalan, a vernacular name for Terminalia chebula, a tree species native to southern Asia